Scopula formosana is a moth of the  family Geometridae. It is found in Taiwan.

References

Moths described in 1934
Taxa named by Louis Beethoven Prout
formosana
Moths of Taiwan